Plaza 1907 (formerly known as The Plaza Grill and Cinema and Crystal Plaza and The Bijou) is located in Ottawa, Kansas and has been named "oldest purpose-built cinema in operation in the world", having applied to Guinness World Records in June 2017 and beaten out a theatre in Denmark by two days.

The theatre is part of the Downtown Ottawa Historic District, which was listed June 29, 1972.

History 
A donation of historic photographs were presented to the Franklin County Historical Society in 2013 included photos of the theater from the early 20th century. Newspaper stories published in 1905 describe movies being shown by Fred Beeler in the building now occupied by the Plaza Grill and Cinema. "The newspaper editor apparently was a big movie fan because he wrote many articles about what a wonderful cultural enrichment the movies were and what a fascinating and safe place for children during matinee showings," said Deb Barker, executive director of the Franklin County Historical Society. The Historical Society hopes to market the theater as a tourist destination.

The historical evidence and sources proving the history of the cinema are:

The owners after 2000 were:

References

External links
Official Website

Buildings and structures in Ottawa, Kansas
Theatres on the National Register of Historic Places in Kansas
Theatres completed in 1907
Tourist attractions in Franklin County, Kansas